The Point Andalusia (German: Planquadrat Andalusien) was a set, secret, location in the Southern Atlantic Ocean, used by warships of Nazi Germany's Kriegsmarine during the Second World War.

History
The location was used by German warships to re-supply during operation in the Southern Atlantic Ocean against allied merchant ships. The location was at 15° S 18° W.

It was an important supply point used by a variety of German ships during the war.

Ships using the supply point
 Admiral Scheer:
 26 December 1940: met raider Pinguin, Thor and supply ships Nordmark and Eurofeld
 24 to 28 January 1941: met Thor and Nordmark
 9 to 10 March 1941: met Pinguin, Kormoran and Nordmark

References

External links
 Admiral Scheer - Schwerer Kreuzer
 Panzerschiff / Schwerer Kreuzer 1934 - 1945  Deutschland  Class

Military history of Germany during World War II
Kriegsmarine